Subhash Kapoor is an Indian film director, and screenwriter. He was a political journalist, and later became known for directing satirical comical dramas like Phas Gaye Re Obama (2010), Jolly LLB (2013) and Jolly LLB 2 (2017).

Career
After completing his MA degree in Hindi literature, Kapoor started his career as a political journalist in Delhi in the 1990s covering North India; thereafter, when his short film got him acclaim in 2001, he started making commercial short films, documentaries and ad films, eventually shifting base to Mumbai in 2006.

Film director
In 2007, Kapoor made his feature film directorial debut with Say Salaam India. The film failed at the box office. In 2010, he directed his second venture, a satire Phas Gaye Re Obama, which featured many comedians. The film managed to do well in India, and received critical acclaim as well as commercial success. Due to the surprise success of the film, Kapoor began writing his next project. In 2013, Kapoor released Jolly LLB, featuring Arshad Warsi, Amrita Rao and Boman Irani. It is a courtroom drama with a comical touch. The film was released on 15 March 2013. He is also the writer/director for Jolly LLB's sequel, Jolly LLB 2, which starred Akshay Kumar,Huma Qureshi, Annu Kapoor, Saurabh Shukla in pivotal roles and released on 10th feb'2017 with tremendous critical acclaim and box office numbers. Total box office worldwide is over 200crs gross.

Director/Writer
 Say Salaam India (2007) 
 Phas Gaye Re Obama (2010) 
 Jolly LLB (2013)
 Guddu Rangeela (2015)
 Jolly LLB 2 (2017)
 Madam Chief Minister (2021)
 Maharani (2021)
 Mogul (film) (TBA)
 Jolly LLB 3 (2024)
 ''Maharani Season-2 (2022)

References 
8. https://scroll.in/reel/1031075/maharani-season-2-review-another-more-focused-round-of-self-serving-politics

External links
 
 Subhash Kapoor profile at the site Twitter

Film directors from Delhi
Living people
Hindi-language film directors
Indian male screenwriters
Year of birth missing (living people)
Indian atheists